Sheykh Alilar (also Romanized as Sheykh ‘Alīlar and Sheikhali Lar; also known as Sheykh Alar, Sheykh-Ali, and Sheykh ‘Alī) is a village in Shal Rural District, Shahrud District, Khalkhal County, Ardabil Province, Iran. At the 2006 census, its population was 19, in 8 families.

References 

Towns and villages in Khalkhal County